Air Raid Wardens is a 1943 comedy film directed by Edward Sedgwick and starring Laurel and Hardy. It was the first of two feature films the duo made at Metro-Goldwyn-Mayer.

Plot
Set during World War II, just after Pearl Harbor, Stan (Stan Laurel) and Ollie (Oliver Hardy) try their hand at various business ventures. Their store opens and closes in various guises but without success. They finally open it as a bicycle store, but it goes bankrupt and they close it down to enlist in the army. They fail in every attempt to succeed in the military and return to their home town Huxton only to find out that their store now is open, with a man named Eustace Middling (Donald Meek) in charge, selling radios instead of bicycles. But Middling offers them to share the space in a joint venture. Stan and Ollie don't realize that Middling in fact is a German spy, using the shop as a front to cover a base for espionage on the US Military.

The pair decide to support the civil defense by becoming air raid wardens in Huxton. To complete their training, they have to take part in an advanced military drill, and Stan of course manages to get the wrong assignment—one that is far more complicated than they can handle. They set out on their mission, to rescue a very prominent banker, J.P. Norton (Howard Freeman), from a fire, but fail hugely, ending up burying the banker alive in a huge load of sand. Still, they are given one more chance to prove their aptitude as air raid wardens, involving the task of ensuring that all the town citizens turn off their lights at night. They get into a quarrel with one of the more troublesome inhabitants, Joe Bledsoe (Edgar Kennedy), resulting in a commotion and a rumor that spy activity is taking place in Joe's home. The boys are knocked out, and in the end they are finally dismissed from the corps altogether.

Back at their shop, they happen to overhear the spies speaking German, and follow them to a hide-out outside of town, where they find out Middling's real name is Mittelhause, and overhear him talking about blowing the town's magnesium plant to pieces with another spy, Rittenhause (Henry O'Neill). They try to send a message to the civil defense, but instead they are captured by the German spies. The boys manage to flee and alert the civil defense, who arrive at the plant just in time to stop the sabotage. Stan and Ollie also expose Middling as a German spy.

Cast

References

Bibliography

 Everson, William K. The Complete Films of Laurel and Hardy. New York: Citadel, 2000, (first edition 1967). .
 Louvish, Simon. Stan and Ollie: The Roots of Comedy. London: Faber & Faber, 2001. .
 McCabe, John. Babe: The Life of Oliver Hardy. London: Robson Books Ltd., 2004. .
 McCabe, John with Al Kilgore and Richard W. Bann. Laurel & Hardy. New York: Bonanza Books, 1983, first edition 1975, E.P. Dutton. .
 McGarry, Annie. Laurel & Hardy. London: Bison Group, 1992. .
MacGillivray, Scott. Laurel & Hardy: From the Forties Forward. Second edition. New York: iUniverse 2009 (first edition 1998). .

External links

 
 
 
 
 

1943 films
Laurel and Hardy (film series)
American black-and-white films
Films directed by Edward Sedgwick
Films set on the home front during World War II
Military humor in film
1943 comedy films
Metro-Goldwyn-Mayer films
Films with screenplays by Charley Rogers
Films scored by Nathaniel Shilkret
Films produced by B. F. Zeidman
1940s English-language films
1940s American films